Norman Calvin Miller (born February 5, 1946) is an American former professional baseball player who played outfielder in the Major Leagues from  to  for the Houston Astros and Atlanta Braves. Later in his career he served in the Astros' front office.

Biography
Miller was born in Los Angeles, California, attended Van Nuys High School (class of 1964) in Van Nuys, California, and is Jewish.

Originally signed out of high school by the Los Angeles Angels as a second baseman, at 18 years of age he batted .301/.446 (5th in the league)/.525 (8th) for the Quad City Angels in the Midwest League in 1964, and was selected by the Houston Astros in the 1964 Rule 5 draft, after which he switched to the outfield. He began 1965 batting .289/.406 (7th in the league)/.492 (7th) with 89 walks (leading the league), 84 runs (5th), 20 home runs (4th), and 92 RBIs (3rd) for the Amarillo Sonics in the Texas League.

When he made his major league debut in 1965, he was the sixth-youngest player in the National League.  His career was curtailed by a back injury, and he retired at the age of 28. Miller appeared in 540 games and notched 325 hits as a Major Leaguer.

Miller scored the winning run in the famous 1968 1-0 24-inning game between the Astros and New York Mets, when Bob Aspromonte's bases-loaded ground ball went through the legs of Met shortstop Al Weis for an error. He was traded from the Astros to the Braves for Cecil Upshaw on April 22, 1973.

In 2004, Miller opened Camp Hardball, a baseball school.

In 2009, Miller published a memoir entitled To All My Fans From 'Norm Who'?. Miller serves as a sports radio host on Saturdays on KILT-AM.

In 2014 he was inducted into the Southern California Jewish Sports Hall of Fame.

References

External links

1946 births
Living people
Amarillo Sonics players
Atlanta Braves players
Baseball players from Los Angeles
Houston Astros players
Jewish American baseball players
Jewish Major League Baseball players
Major League Baseball outfielders
Oklahoma City 89ers players
Quad Cities Angels players
Florida Instructional League Astros/Reds players
Van Nuys High School alumni
People from Van Nuys, Los Angeles
21st-century American Jews